Eastside Spirit and Pride (ESSP) is a club in East Los Angeles College, founded by Dennis Sanchez. The club is involved in East Los Angeles College, and has made contributions to the school and the surrounding community.

Mission of the Organization
The mission of ESSP is to assist students of East Los Angeles College to realize their potential and successfully transfer to four-year universities. ESSP raises funds to create scholarship for students.  In addition ESSP has established an irrevocable sense of pride in the school and in the greater community, focusing on East Los Angeles. In addition, ESSP seeks to instill a strong sense of self-esteem in students who have had to overcome great obstacles to attend college.

History of the Club and Its Contributions to East Los Angeles College
Professor Dennis Sanchez, an alumnus of the University of Southern California and San Francisco State University found his occupational satisfaction in coming to East Los Angeles College and serving as an English professor because he wanted to give back to the community. He felt that students in ELAC were equally diligent as students at other community colleges, yet they were compelled by their circumstances to overcome much more adversity and sorrows. Therefore, he established East Side Spirit and Pride so that students of the college could develop a veracious sense of pride in their community and heritage.

East Side Spirit and Pride was a major advocate for the restoration football team at ELAC when football had been eliminated due to budgetary constraints.

Professor Sanchez along with the East Side Spirit and Pride members instigated the idea of the creation of a marching band,
 which could help pervade a sense of high-spirits and joy regarding East Los Angeles College. ESSP collaborated with the President of the college, Ernest Moreno, for the achievement of this objective, making ELAC, one of only three colleges in the entire state of California with a marching band during the time. To this day, the marching band has played an integral role in the atmosphere of the college and regularly performs during special occasions, such as football games and the annual commencement ceremony.

East Side Spirit and Pride Today
Today, East Side Spirit and Pride involves dozens of students, faculty, and staff every semester.  In addition, ESSP has a board of directors of nineteen members most of whom are former ESSP members as well as graduates of East Los Angeles College. The club holds regular meetings on Tuesdays and Wednesdays. ESSP also regularly features motivational speakers, generally former students of East Los Angeles College who have now graduated from four year universities and sometimes local celebrities, including Chase Masterson, actress,  Luis J. Rodriguez, a Mexican-American native of East Los Angeles and famous author of the book Always Running: La Vida Loca, Gang Days in L.A., and congresswoman Judy Chu both honored at ESSP's annual scholarship dinner.

The club also routinely hosts tours to various neighboring universities, such as Cal State Dominguez Hills, Cal State Fullerton, Cal State Los Angeles, UCLA, USC, Occidental and Loyola Marymount University, where students have the opportunity to frequent campus grounds and explore possible options for their higher education.

East Side Spirit and Pride also has weekly readings, known as Great Moments in Literature, where professors and students read and openly discuss and analyze the meanings of various literary works, many by renowned authors and poets such as Robert Frost, Ernest Hemingway, Emily Dickinson, William Shakespeare, and E. A. Robinson.

The club also has interactive and informative discussions concerning procedures and important things-to-know relating to transferring to four-year universities in California, primarily the UCs, CSUs, and private universities such as USC.
The club consists of over fifty members, a board of directors of nineteen members, an associate board, a faculty/staff committee as well as chapters of trustees throughout Southern California.  The club has welcomed UCLA graduate and English professor Nancy Ramirez as co-sponsor of the club.  Also joining ESSP are parents and players from West Hills Baseball, CA, who have partnered to help with the ESSP scholarship dinner and golf tournament to help raise funds for ELAC students.

On March 15, 2014, a fundraising event will be sponsored by East Side Spirit and Pride, featuring special guest, Edward James Olmos, alumni of East Los Angeles College and Academy Award nominee for his role in Stand and Deliver.

Partnership with Homeboy Industries

In 2010, East Side Spirit and Pride partnered up with Father Greg Boyle and Homeboy Industries in an attempt to reach out to the surrounding community. Professor Dennis Sanchez teaches a class called Bridge to College at Homeboy Industries on a routine basis in addition to having ESSP members tutor members of Homeboy Industry.  In addition he takes members from Homeboy Industries on tours to East Los Angeles College and other colleges in the Los Angeles area. As a result, many students from Homeboy Industry have enrolled at East Los Angeles College and other community colleges in the greater Los Angeles area.  Proceeds from the ESSP Annual Scholarship Dinner and its lunch and golf tournament go to fund educational scholarships and grants for members of Homeboy Industries and other at-risk members of the community.

Extensions and Divisions of East Side Spirit and Pride
Tuesday ESSP
East Side Spirit and Pride Teacher's Committee
Committee of East Side Spirit and Pride's Annual Dinner
East Side Spirit and Pride Board of Directors
East Side Spirit and Pride Board of Trustees

References

External links
 East Side Spirit and Pride Club website
 elac.edu: East Los Angeles College website

Clubs and societies in the United States
Eastside Los Angeles
Organizations based in Los Angeles
Non-profit organizations based in California